Turzyniec may refer to the following places in Poland:

Turzyniec, Lublin Voivodeship, village in Lublin Voivodeship
Turzyniec, West Pomeranian Voivodeship, village in West Pomeranian Voivodeship